Hope in Ghosts is the post-rock or indie rock project of Ted Flynn. Early reviews of the first release, e.p., garnered immediate comparisons with Slint and Seam, while the 2007 release of All your Departures placed Flynn on the same label, Chicago's Actually, Records, as the band ee, which includes Seam front man Sooyoung Park.

The music of Hope in Ghosts is characterized mostly by slow-building, layered and melancholy guitar work that generally builds to anthemic proportions.

Discography

Albums
2007 - All your Departures

EPs and singles
2001 - e.p.

External links
Official website

Current label
Official Myspace

References

Indie rock musical groups from Illinois
Musical groups from Chicago